The men's long jump at the 1946 European Athletics Championships was held in Oslo, Norway, at Bislett Stadion on 24 August 1946.

Medalists

Results

Final
24 August

Qualification
24 August

Participation
According to an unofficial count, 14 athletes from 10 countries participated in the event.

 (1)
 (2)
 (1)
 (1)
 (2)
 (1)
 (1)
 (2)
 (2)
 (1)

References

Long jump
Long jump at the European Athletics Championships